Jean-Pierre Le Bras (5 February 1931 – 23 July 2017) was a French landscape and maritime painter. He was an official Peintre de la Marine from 1997 to 2017.

References

1931 births
2017 deaths
People from Côtes-d'Armor
20th-century French painters
20th-century French male artists
21st-century French painters
21st-century French male artists
French landscape painters
French male painters
Peintres de la Marine